Separdan (also Romanized as Separdān, Sepordān, and Sopordān; also known as Supurdan) is a village in Malfejan Rural District, in the Central District of Siahkal County, Gilan Province, Iran. At the 2006 census, its population was 233, in 74 families.

References 

Populated places in Siahkal County